Bernat Quintana (born 1985) is a Spanish actor best known for his role as Max Carbó in TV3 television soap opera El Cor de la Ciutat and as the main character of the 2019 film Boi.

Theatre
 Cyrano (2013)
 Julieta y Romeo (2011)
 Molt Soroll per no res (2011)
 Les Tres Germanes (2011)
 La Síndrome de Bucay (2010)
 El Mal de la Joventut (2009)
 Lleons (2009)
 Dublin Carol (2008)
 Búfals (2008)
 J.R.S. (2003)
 Bernadeta Xoc (1999)
 El Criptograma (1999)
 L’home, la bèstia i la virtut (1995)

Movies
 Boi (2019)
 Jo, el desconegut (2007)
 Càmping (2006)
 Vorvik (2005)
 Valèria, dirigit per Sílvia Quer (2000)
 La ciudad de los prodigios (1999)
 La presó orgànica, de Jordi Soler (1998)

Television
 Barcelona Ciutat Neutral (2011)
 El Cor de la Ciutat (2000–2009)
 Laura (1998)

References

Male film actors from Catalonia
Male stage actors from Catalonia
Male television actors from Catalonia
Male actors from Barcelona
People from Sabadell
1986 births
Living people
Spanish male television actors
Spanish male film actors
Spanish male stage actors